Mary Haughey, Baroness Ballyedmond (born December 1947) is a billionaire heiress from Northern Ireland who is the deputy chairman of Norbrook Laboratories. She is currently the sixth richest person in Ireland and the richest person in Northern Ireland.

Born Mary Gordon Young in December 1947, she attended Newry High School where she was Head Girl. She then trained as a solicitor and was a part-time lecturer in law at Queen's University Belfast.
In 1972 she married Edward Haughey, Baron Ballyedmond. Following his death in a helicopter crash on 14 March 2014, she inherited his wealth.

According to The Sunday Times Rich List in 2019 her net worth was estimated at £1.638 billion.

Personal life
She has three children; Caroline, a practicing barrister in London, Edward a qualified barrister and James a qualified medical doctor.
James and Edward are currently directors of Norbrook.

References

1947 births
Living people
Irish billionaires
Irish businesspeople
Irish corporate directors
British billionaires
British corporate directors
Ballyedmond
Spouses of life peers